Events from the year 2023 in Scotland.

Incumbents 
 First Minister: Nicola Sturgeon
 Secretary of State: Alister Jack

Events

January
 2 January – Three people are killed after a fire breaks out at the New County Hotel in Perth.
 16 January
 Teachers in Scotland begin 16 days of "rolling" strike action, with strikes occurring in two local authorities each day, beginning with Glasgow and East Lothian.
 The UK government announces it will block the Gender Recognition Reform (Scotland) Bill amid concerns about its impact on UK-wide equality law.
 23 January – A fire breaks out in former department store Jenners on Princes Street, Edinburgh, resulting in the death of a firefighter and the injury of four others.
 24 January – Following a trial at the High Court of Glasgow, transgender woman Isla Bryson is convicted of raping two women in 2016 and 2019, the offences having been committed before she began gender reassignment therapy. She is remanded to Cornton Vale women's prison, but moved to HMP Edinburgh two days later after First Minister Nicola Sturgeon says Bryson will not be allowed to serve her sentence at Cornton Vale.
 28 January – Following controversy over the Isla Bryson case, the Daily Record reports that Tiffany Scott, a trans woman subject to an Order for Lifelong Restriction for stalking a 13-year-old girl, has successfully applied for a transfer from a men's prison to a women's facility. The Scottish Conservatives urge the Scottish Government to halt the move.
 29 January – The Scottish Prison Service pauses the movement of all transgender prisoners while it carries out an "urgent review" into the transgender cases held in its custody.

February
 9 February – The Scottish Prison Service concludes its review of accommodating transgender prisoners, and recommends that transgender prisoners initially be accommodated according to their sex at birth while an individual assessment is carried out.
 10 February – Following a legal challenge by lap dance performers and club owners, a ban on lap dancing clubs in Edinburgh, scheduled to come into force in April, is overturned by Edinburgh's Court of Session after it finds Edinburgh City Council acted illegally by voting to limit the number of sexual entertainment venues in the city from four to zero.
 15 February – Nicola Sturgeon announces her resignation as First Minister of Scotland and Leader of the Scottish National Party after eight years in the role; she will stay on until her successor has been elected.
 16 February – Deputy First Minister John Swinney  rules himself out of the SNP leadership contest.
 17 February – The Royal College of Nursing recommends its members accept a new pay offer of 6.5%. The offer from the Scottish Government also includes changes to conditions.
 19 February –
 Scottish Health Secretary Humza Yousaf and former Minister for Community Safety Ash Regan become the first two candidates to announce they will stand in the Scottish National Party leadership election. Keith Brown, the SNP's depute leader, Neil Gray, the Minister for International Development, and Màiri McAllan, the Environment Minister, all rule themselves out of the contest.
 In a speech to the Scottish Labour Party conference in Edinburgh, Labour leader Sir Keir Starmer rules out a deal with the SNP "under any circumstances", and warns against complacency following the departure of Nicola Sturgeon as SNP leader and First Minister.
 20 February – Finance Secretary Kate Forbes announces she is running in the Scottish National Party leadership election.
 21 February –
 Kate Forbes insists her campaign to become the next SNP leader has not been derailed after she lost the support of several colleagues following comments about same-sex marriage and having children outside marriage, both of which she is opposed to as a member of the Free Church of Scotland.
 MSPs vote 68–57 to approve the Scottish Government's budget for the 2023–24 financial year, which includes a tax rise for everyone in Scotland earning more than £43,662.
 23 February – Sir Iain Livingstone announces he will retire as Chief Constable of Police Scotland in the summer after five years in the post.
 24 February
 Nominations close for the SNP leadership election, with Kate Forbes, Ash Regan and Humza Yousaf having all reached the threshold of supporters to go forward into the contest.
 Two crew died after tugboat capsized & sank close to Greenock harbour.
 25 February – Members of the Scottish Secondary Teachers' Association (SSTA) vote to accept a new pay offer from the Scottish Government, and announce they have suspended strike action scheduled for the following week.
 28 February – Transgender rapist Isla Bryson is sentenced to eight years in prison with a further three years supervision.

March
 1 March – Statistics released by the Scottish Government indicate Scotland's economy grew by 0.1% during the three months from October to December 2022. 
 2 March – Minister for Transport Jenny Gilruth announces plans to nationalise the overnight Caledonian Sleeper train service that links London with several locations in Scotland, taking effect from 25 June.  
 3 March – 
The Educational Institute of Scotland and other teaching unions call off a planned 20 days of rolling strikes scheduled to begin on 13 March after receiving an improved pay offer from the Scottish Government, worth 14.6% over 28 months. The proposals will now be put to a ballot.  
Loganair announces it will suspend flights between Inverness Airport and some island airports for at least six weeks from 17 March because of industrial action scheduled to begin at Highland and Islands Airports Limited.
 6 March – BBC News reports that the Scottish Prison Service is to be investigated for corporate manslaughter over the death of Allan Marshall, a prisoner at HMP Edinburgh, who died after being restrained by 13 prison officers in 2015. 
 7 March – STV hosts the first televised debate of the Scottish National Party leadership election. 
 10 March – Members of Scotland's largest teaching union, the Educational Institute of Scotland, vote to accept a pay deal from the Scottish Government that will end ongoing strikes in schools.  
 13 March – Voting opens in the Scottish National Party leadership election. 
 14 March – 
Members of the NASUWT narrowly vote to accept a pay offer, ending the prospect of further strike action in schools in Scotland. 
BBC Scotland hosts the final televised debate of the SNP leadership election. 
 16 March – Scientists identify a gene variant that is known to increases the risk of breast and ovarian cancer, and trace it to people with Orkney Island heritage, more specifically those with ancestry on the island of Westray.
 18 March – Peter Murrell resigns as chief executive of the Scottish National Party amid a row over party membership. Mike Russell succeeds him as interim chief executive. 
 21 March – At 8pm, Times Radio airs a leadership debate from Edinburgh and featuring the three candidates in the Scottish National Party leadership election. 
 27 March – The result of the 2023 Scottish National Party leadership election to replace Nicola Sturgeon is announced.

Deaths 
 1 January – Frank McGarvey, Scottish footballer (St Mirren, Celtic, national team) (b. 1956)

See also 
 2023 in Northern Ireland
 2023 in Wales
 2023 in the United Kingdom
 Politics of Scotland

References 

 
Scotland
2020s in Scotland
Years of the 21st century in Scotland